The Aube is a river in France, a right tributary of the Seine. The river gives its name to the Aube department.

Its source is in the Haute-Marne department, on the plateau of Langres, near the town of Auberive. It flows through the departments of Haute-Marne, Côte-d'Or, Aube, and Marne. It flows into the river Seine near Marcilly-sur-Seine. Cities along the river include Bar-sur-Aube and Arcis-sur-Aube.

Main tributaries 
 Aubette
 Aujon
 Landon
 Voire
 Ravet
 Meldançon
 Puits
 Huitrelle
 Herbissonne
 Barbuise
 Salon
 Superbe

Departments and towns crossed 

 Haute-Marne: Auberive
 Côte-d'Or: Montigny-sur-Aube
 Aube: Bar-sur-Aube, Brienne-le-Château, Ramerupt, Arcis-sur-Aube
 Marne: Anglure

See also 
 The Albian Age in the Cretaceous Period of geological time is named for the River Aube (after the Latin name for the river, Alba)
 Rivers of France

References

External links 
 

Rivers of Aube
Rivers of Côte-d'Or
Rivers of Haute-Marne
Rivers of Marne (department)
Rivers of Bourgogne-Franche-Comté
Rivers of Grand Est
Rivers of France